Cedar Beach is an unincorporated community in Sussex County, Delaware, United States. Cedar Beach is located along the Delaware Bay at the eastern end of Delaware Route 36, north of Slaughter Beach.

References

Unincorporated communities in Sussex County, Delaware
Unincorporated communities in Delaware